Sarayacu District is one of six districts of the Ucayali Province in Peru.

References

Districts of the Ucayali Province
Districts of the Loreto Region